Red Jihad: Battle for South Asia is a political/military thriller by Sami Ahmad Khan. It was published by Rupa & Co. in June 2012. Red Jihad was hailed as one of the first novels to fictionalize the Maoist-Mujahideen nexus in the Indian Red Corridor and for dramatizing the links between religious fundamentalism and political terrorism in India.

Red Jihad was Khan's debut. After its publication, Businessworld magazine said Khan "might have started a genre that will lead many youngsters to learn the English language the way an earlier generation learnt it: through our own Robert Ludlums and Fredrick Forsyths." Khan has also been labelled as the Indian equivalent of Tom Clancy by the Millennium Post.

Plot
The novel was written in 2010, published in 2012, and set in 2014 AD, in the near-future. Pakistan has transitioned into a full-fledged democracy and is reconciling with India. However, there are forces working against this fragile peace. A Pakistani jihadi leader, Yasser Basheer, travels to the Red Corridor and enlists the support of an Indian Naxalite commander, Agyaat. Their plan: to unleash Pralay, India's experimental intercontinental ballistic missile, on the subcontinent. As the missile changes course en route, it hits Pakistan and causes collateral damage. In response, Pakistan unleashes war on India. The battle for South Asia turns murkier as an Indo-Pak war threatens to embroil many other countries in the endgame. Have India and Pakistan sparked off the mother of all wars? A gripping thriller, Red Jihad explores the most feared nexus between the jihadis and the naxals.

Awards and reception
Red Jihad: Battle for South Asia garnered generally positive reception and the novel went into a reprint within months of its release. It was praised by think tank Policy Research Group for its "impartiality and sensitivity towards complex geo-political relations and ideologies" and "being able to crystal gaze into the future of Indo-Pak relations" and for extrapolating from contemporary scenarios.

Literary Awards: Red Jihad won the "Muse India Young Writer (Runner-Up) Award" at the Hyderabad Literary Festival 2013 and "Excellence in Youth Fiction Writing" at Delhi World Book Fair 2013.

Sequel
Khan is now working on his second book, a science-fiction sequel to Red Jihad, that is themed around time-travel and alternate history. The working title of the sequel is Aliens in Delhi.

References

External links
Thehindu.com

2012 Indian novels
Political thriller novels
Rupa Publications books
Indian Armed Forces in fiction
India–Pakistan relations in popular culture
Naxalite–Maoist insurgency
Indian political novels
Novels about nuclear war and weapons
Novels set in India
Novels set in Pakistan
Fiction set in 2014